Sreeranga Rajan is an engineer at Fujitsu Laboratories of America in Sunnyvale, California. He was named a Fellow of the Institute of Electrical and Electronics Engineers (IEEE) in 2016 for his contributions to scalable formal verification of software and hardware systems.

References 

Fellow Members of the IEEE
Living people
Year of birth missing (living people)
Place of birth missing (living people)
American electrical engineers